Mr. Clutch is the nickname of:

Francis Arnaiz (born 1951), Filipino basketball player
Glenn Davis (halfback) (1924–2005), American football player
Dante Lavelli (1923–2009), American football player
Joe Sakic (born 1969), Canadian ice hockey player
Pat Tabler (born 1958), American baseball player and sportscaster
Adam Vinatieri (born 1972), American football player
Jerry West (born 1938), American basketball player

See also
Clutch (disambiguation)

Lists of people by nickname